Matthias Rahn (born 17 May 1990) is a German former footballer who played as a centre-back.

Career
He joined MSV Duisburg on 4 January 2020. After the end of the 2019–20 season, he left Duisburg. He afterwards signed for Energie Cottbus.

Career statistics

References

External links

Living people
1990 births
Association football defenders
German footballers
FC Rot-Weiß Erfurt players
KSV Hessen Kassel players
Sportfreunde Lotte players
SV Wacker Burghausen players
MSV Duisburg players
FC Energie Cottbus players
3. Liga players
Regionalliga players
Oberliga (football) players
People from Bad Langensalza
Footballers from Thuringia